For the most recent Mid-year window go to 2022 July rugby union tests

The July Tests, also known as the summer Tests or mid-year Tests, are international rugby union matches played around the month of July each year. They include traditional summer tours by European nations to countries in the southern hemisphere, North America or Japan, as well as shorter international trips and one-off test matches. They follow the end of the domestic rugby season for northern hemisphere countries. In 2008, the International Rugby Board (IRB) introduced a three-weekend window in June during which players are required to be released by their clubs for international matches. From 2020 due to changes to the World Rugby international calendar, the window will be moved to July.

Mid-year tests since 2004

2004

Australia hosted a tour by Scotland and won 2-0, while New Zealand won their home series against England by the same score. Ireland made a tour of South Africa, losing their 2-0. The Pacific Islanders (made up of Fiji, Tonga and Samoa players) played Australia, New Zealand and South Africa once each, losing all 3 matches. Wales toured Argentina, drawing 1-1. France visited the US and Canada, playing one test against each, and winning both.

2005

2005 saw the British & Irish Lions undertake their first tour of New Zealand since 1993. New Zealand comprehensively won 3-0. Ireland and Wales toured with teams weakened by players representing the Lions; Wales won one test each against the USA and Canada, while Japan were defeated 2–0 by Ireland. Japan had previously visited Uruguay and Argentina, losing one test to each.

Australia won home tests against Samoa, Italy and France. Australia then played South Africa twice, home and away, with the home team winning each time. South Africa hosted a two-test series against France, winning 1-0 with one match drawn. Italy also toured Argentina, drawing a two-test series 1-1.

2006

Notes:
 Ireland lost both tests on their New Zealand tour. Ireland also lost a one-off test against Australia, which was played in Perth.

2007

2008

2009

2010

2011

This was the first time since 1973, and only the second in the past 50 years, that none of the Home nations, or the British & Irish Lions, toured the southern hemisphere in the summer. Instead, there were warm-up matches ahead of the 2011 Rugby World Cup in New Zealand.

2012

In 2012 the IRB formalised a global rugby calendar, which will run until 2019. The calendar includes a return of some traditional tours by European teams, in which a team plays multiple tests against a southern hemisphere side, often with mid-week matches against provincial or regional sides.

England and Wales beat the Barbarians, with only Wales awarding caps, before touring South Africa and Australia respectively.
South Africa hosted England for three tests, the first extended tour there since the Lions' 1997 tour, and won the series 2-0, with one draw.

Australia hosted Wales, playing their first three-test home series since the visit of the Lions in 2001, and winning 3-0. Australia had already lost a home test to Scotland, who also beat Fiji and Samoa in single tests. Scotland's visit to the Pacific islands was the first tour there by a tier 1 nation since 2006.

Ireland lost to the Barbarians, also a non-cap game, before touring New Zealand and being swept 3-0 in the series. This was Ireland and New Zealand's first ever three-test series, and the first longer tour hosted there since the Lions' visit in 2005.

Argentina hosted France, drawing a two-test series 1-1, and Italy, who they defeated in a single test. Italy also played tests against the USA and Canada, winning both.

The new calendar also provided expanded opportunities for "Tier 2" nations. Georgia visited Canada and the USA, losing one-off test matches to both. After their Pacific Nations Cup games, Japan played two home matches against the French Barbarians, losing both.

Notes:
 South Africa and England drew the final test, South Africa winning the series 2-0.

2013

Note:
 The South African Quadrangular Tournament was a mini tournament that included hosts South Africa and three incoming nations; Italy, Scotland and Samoa.

2014

2015

Because of the 2015 Rugby World Cup, no test series took place between the Home Unions (England, Ireland, Scotland and Wales) and the SANZAR nations (South Africa, New Zealand and Australia). However, England, Ireland, Uruguay, Argentina, and South Africa did opt to play uncapped matches to assist their World Cup preparations.

Some Test matches were still played. Samoa hosted New Zealand in Apia, and Fiji hosted the Maori All Blacks in Suva. Kenya hosted test matches against Portugal and Spain. A two test-series was also played with Russia touring to Namibia.

2016

2017

2018

2019

Because of the 2019 Rugby World Cup, no test series took place between the Home Unions (England, Ireland, Scotland and Wales) and the SANZAAR nations (South Africa, New Zealand and Australia and Argentina). However, Uruguay did opt to play a match to assist their World Cup preparation.

Some Test matches were still played. Spain and Romania toured South America, both teams playing tests against Brazil and Chile with Spain playing an addition match against Uruguay.

2020

2021

2022

Other tours

Notes

See also
 End-of-year rugby union internationals

References

 
Rugby union matches